Maksim Andreyevich Kovalskiy (born 6 February 1993) is a former Russian football defender.

Club career
He made his debut for PFC Spartak Nalchik on 17 July 2011 in a Russian Cup game against FC Torpedo Vladimir.

Kovalskiy made his debut in the Russian Second Division for FC Rus Saint Petersburg on 20 April 2013 in a game against FC Lokomotiv-2 Moscow.

References

External links
 
 
 Career summary by sportbox.ru
 

1993 births
Footballers from Saint Petersburg
Living people
Russian footballers
Association football defenders
PFC Spartak Nalchik players
FC Taganrog players